Andrew Lack may refer to:

 Andrew Lack (author) (born 1953), English biologist and author
 Andrew Lack (executive) (born 1947), chairman of NBC News and MSNBC